The Spoiler  is an Australian police drama series which first screened on the Nine Network in 1972. It was created by Robert Bruning and ran for 13 episodes.

Cast
 Bruce Barry as Jim Carver
 Carmen Duncan as Marie
 Serge Lazareff as Teddy
 Slim DeGrey as Det. Sgt. Eric Evans
 Ken Hunter-Kerr as Sir Ian Mason

References

External links
 
The Spoiler at AustLit (subscription required)

Nine Network original programming
Television shows set in New South Wales
1972 Australian television series debuts
1972 Australian television series endings
1970s Australian crime television series
1970s Australian drama television series